Rafiath Rashid Mithila, who is best known by her stage name as Mithila, is a Bangladeshi actress, singer, model, and development worker. She is currently the head of the Early Childhood Development programme in BRAC.

Early life and education
Mithila completed her bachelor's and master's in political science at the University of Dhaka. She completed her second master's in early childhood development from BRAC University.  She was a valedictorian and achieved the Chancellor's gold medal for her academic performance in her master's degree in 2016. Mithila started her PhD at the University of Geneva in December 2019. She took Kathak, Manipuri, and Bharat Natyam dance lessons at Benuka Dance Academy, and was trained in Nazrul Geeti at the Hindol Music Academy. She was a student of the art school Nandan; some of her oil paintings were displayed in the Drik Gallery as part of a group exhibition.

Career

Audio-visual media 
Mithila started her modeling career in 2002 with the cultural and fashion shows of fashion house Neelanjana Palli. She appeared in TV commercials and became the brand ambassador for many brands and products, such as Robi, Banglalink, Hayes and Haier, Close-Up toothpaste, and Huawei. She was the model in the music videos Moyna Go and Ghum by Habib Wahid and Ki Hole Ki Hoto by Arnob, and acted in various dramas and telefilms, including X-Factor, Land phone er din gulote prem, and Denmohor; she became popular after acting in House Full.

Development
Mithila currently works as the head of Early Childhood Development at BRAC.

Children Book Author
Mithilia wrote a number of children books. She publishes her two books - Tanzaniyar Dwipe (তানজানিয়ার দ্বীপে), Afrikay Singher Khoje (আফ্রিকায় সিংহের খোঁজে) with popular children book publisher - Goofi Books. She also published a set of two books for young children: School er Prothom Din, Laal Balloon, and Ayra aar Maaer Obhijaan.

Personal life
Mithila met Tahsan Rahman Khan, a musician, in 2004, and they married on 3 August 2006. Together they got a daughter, Ayra Tehreem Khan (b. 2013). In July 2017, the couple announced their divorce. On 6 December 2019, Mithila married Srijit Mukherji.

Shayan Chowdhury Arnob is Mithila's cousin.

She has completed her graduation from BRAC University

Works

Television dramas and telefilms

 House Full
 Anti Clock
 Punch Clip
 Prem Keboli Ekti Rashayonik Bikria
 Landphoner Dingulote Prem
 Anger Story
 After Marriage
 Promise
 He and she
 Mr. and Mrs.
 Amar golpe tumi
 Nobab gunda
 Proof reader
 Amar kotha
 Choto Pakhi
 Life Insurance
 Thikana
 Batch 27
 Batch 27 - the last page
 Biyer daoat roilo
 Denmohor
 Ghum
 X-factor
 Kothopokokhon
 Timeline

Short films
 Mukhomukhi
 Ekti Shobuj Bag
 WTF (Welcome To Family)
 Joggota
 Dure Thaka Kacher Manush
 Khola Janala
 Trap

Songs
 Ogochore (in film 3rd Person Singular Number)
 Thikana (Title track in natok 'Thikana')
 Tomar Amar (Title track in Natok 'Mr. And Mrs')
 Title track in Natok 'Amar Golpe Tumi'
 Chile Amar (title track of natok 'kothopokothon')
 Rodela dupure
 Shesher Golpo
 Onubhuti
 Brittalpona
 Durotto

Lyrics
 Shosta Khobh
 Ogochore
 Rodela dupure
 Shesher gaan
 Durotto
 Dure
 Tomar Amar
 Nirbashito
 Pagla Ghuri
 Sroter Sheshe

Music video
 Ghum (Habib)
 Ki Hole Ki Hoto (Arnob)

TV show
 'Amar Ami' on Bangla Vision
 'Onek Ojana Kotha' on Zee5

Radio show
 'Berey Othar Golpo' on Radio Shadhin

Children's Literature
 School er Prothom Din
 Laal Balloon
 Ayra ar Maa er Obhijan - Adventure series - 'Tanzaniar Dip e'

Films

Web series

References

Year of birth missing (living people)
Place of birth missing (living people)
Living people
21st-century Bangladeshi women singers
21st-century Bangladeshi singers
Bangladeshi female models
Bangladeshi television actresses
University of Dhaka alumni
BRAC University alumni